Iolaus pseudofrater is a butterfly in the family Lycaenidae. It is found in Uganda (from the south-west to the Kigezi District).

References

Butterflies described in 1962
Iolaus (butterfly)
Endemic fauna of Uganda
Butterflies of Africa